List of parties participating in the 2001 Bangladesh elections
Party name followed by election symbol.

National Patriotic Party - Aeroplane
Bangladesh Khelafat Andolon - Banyan Tree
Ganatantri Party - Pigeon
Bangladesher Samajtantrik Dal - Lock
Bangladesh Awami League - Boat
Bangladesh Gano Azadi League (Samad) - Dheki (Husking pedal)
United Peoples Party - Bullock cart
Bangladesh Islamic Front - Candle
Bangladesher Samyabadi Dal (Marksbadi-Leninbadi) - Chair
Bangladesh Hindu League - Conch-shell (Shankha)
Bangladesh People's League - Elephant
Jatiya Samajtanrik Dal - Torch
Workers Party of Bangladesh - Hammer
Bangladesh Bekar Samaj - Pushcart
Bangladesh National Congress - Horse
Bangladesh National Awami Party (NAP) - Hut
Jatiya Janata Party (Sheikh Asad) - Deer
Bangladesh Muslim League - Lantern (Hurricane)
Pragatishil Jatiyatabadi Dal (Nurul Alam Mowla) - Moon
Jatiya Party (Ershad) - Plough
Bangladesh Samajtantrik Dal (Mahbub) - Rickshaw
Zaker Party - Rose
Jamaat-e-Islami Bangladesh - Balance
Bangladesh Nationalist Party - Sheaf of Paddy
Bangladesher Communist Party - Sickle
Jatiya Biplobi Front - Kite
Progotishil Ganatantrik Party - Spade
Freedom Party - Star
Bangladesh Islami Biplobi Parishad - Sword
National Democratic Party - Tiger
Shramik Krishak Samajbadi Dal - Umbrella
Bangladesh Sarbahara Party - Wheel
Oikyo Prokria - Lion
Communist Kendra - Key
Democratic Republican Party - Peacock
Deshprem Party - Ektara
New York Taxi Driver Shomiti (Abdul Majumder) - Yellow Taxi
Bangladesh Krishak Sramik Janata Party - Book
Bangladesh Bhashani Adayrsha Bastabayon Party - Duck
Bangladesh Samajik Sangsad (Darshan Shabha) - Mango
Bangladesh Peoples Party - Rocket
Bhashani Front - Lamp
Bangladesh Islami Party - Pitcher
Kuran Darshan Sangstha Bangladesh - Anchor
Kuran O Sunnah Bastabayon Party - Apple
Liberal Party Bangladesh - Oar
Gano Forum - Rising Sun
Gano Oikya Front - Balloon
Jatya Samajtantrik Dal (Mohiuddin) - Battery
Jatya Daridra Party - Thala (Plate)
Janadal - Bucket
Tahreek-e-Olema-e-Bangladesh Table
National Awami Party (Bhashani-Mushtak) - Camel
Bangladesh Jatiya Sheba Dal - Coconut
Bangladesh Jatyatabadi Awami League (Mostafa Allam) - Tube-well
Bangladesh Janata Party - Bus
Bangladesh Tanjimul Muslemeen Garland
Bangladesh Mehnati Front - Helicopter
Bangladesh National Awami Party (Bhashani) - Fishing Hook
Bangladesh Tofsili Jati Federation (Sudheer Chandra Sirker)- Palki (Palanquin)
Hoq Kathar Moncha - Prawn
Sath Daliya Jote (Mirpur) -  Mathal (Straw hat)
Samridda Bangladesh Andolon - Fish
Sammillita Sangram Parishad - Table Clock
Social Democratic Party - Mug
Bangladesh Tofsili Jati Federation (Swapan Kumar Mondol) - Jack Fruit
Bangladesh Jatiya Agrogati Party (Abdur Rahim Sikdar) - Tiffin Carrier
Bangladesh Krishak Sramik Mukti Andolon (Krishak Mohammed Sadeq) - Cock
Bangladesh Manobadhikar Dal - Pineapple
Bangladesh Jatiya League (Abdus Sobhan) - Top
Bangladesh Bastahara Parishad - Truck
Shramajibi Oikya Forum (Shamsul Islam) - Telephone
Islami Dal Bangladesh (Saifur Rahman) - Tractor
Bangladesh Krishak Raj Islami Party (Quari Fazlul Hoq Sardar) - Glass
Bangladesh National Awami Party (NAP-Bhashani) - Stick
Islami Al Jihad Dal - Bunch of Bananas
Jamiat Olemaye Islam Bangladesh - Date Tree
Jatiya Janata Party (Adv Nurul Islam Khan) - Ladder
Peoples Muslim League - Suitcase
Samriddhay Bangladesh Bapshayee Sampraday - Spoon
Krishak Sramik Janata League - Gamcha
Bangladesh Jatiya Tati Dal - Spinning Wheel
Jatiya Party (Manju) - Bicycle
Bangladesh Progressive Party - Pen and inkpot
Liberal Democratic Party - Wrist
Jatiya Janata Party-Hafizur - Cow
Islami Oikya Jote - Minaret
Islami Shashantantro Andolon - Hand-fan
People's Democratic Party - Car
Bangladesh Labour Party - Motorcycle
Bangladesh Nejam-e-Islam Party - Butterfly
Pakmon People's Party - Rail-engine
Somo-Samaj Ganotantri Party - Building
Bangladesh Krishak Sramik Awami League - Mike
Bangladesh People's Congress - Television
Bangladesh Jatiyatabadi Palli Dal - Cauliflower

Bangladesh, 2001

Political parties, 2001
Bangladesh, 2001